Abdou Mbacke Thiam (born 3 February 1992) is a Senegalese footballer who plays as a forward for Forward Madison FC in USL League One.

References

External links
Profile at UCONN Athletics

1992 births
Living people
Louisville City FC players
USL Championship players
Senegalese footballers
Senegalese expatriate footballers
Association football forwards
UConn Huskies men's soccer players
Senegalese expatriate sportspeople in the United States
Expatriate soccer players in the United States
Footballers from Dakar
Forward Madison FC players
USL League One players